is a railway station in the city of Fukuroi, Shizuoka Prefecture, Japan, It is operated by the Central Japan Railway Company (JR Tōkai).

Routes

Station 
The station has two side platforms, each serving one track.

Platforms

History
Mikuriya Station opened on 14 March 2020. The station is close to the factory and offices of Yamaha Motor Company, as well as Yamaha Stadium, home to J. League club Júbilo Iwata.

See also
 List of Railway Stations in Japan

References

External links

.

Railway stations in Shizuoka Prefecture
Tōkaidō Main Line
Railway stations in Japan opened in 2020
Stations of Central Japan Railway Company
Iwata, Shizuoka